for winners of the Inter Dominion see: Inter Dominion Pacing Championship and Inter Dominion Trotting Championship

The Inter Dominion is a harness racing competition that has been contested since 1936 in Australia and New Zealand.

It is often referred to as the Inter Dominions or Interdoms for short as it generally encompasses two series:

 the Inter Dominion Pacing Championship for pacers and
 the Inter Dominion Trotting Championship for trotters.

The host of the series was rotated between the six harness racing states of Australia and the North and South Islands of New Zealand. The first Inter Dominion was held at Gloucester Park in Perth, Western Australia in 1936.

The 2011 series was held at Alexandra Park in Auckland, with the original venue of Addington in Christchurch deemed unsuitable due to the February 2011 Christchurch earthquake. The 2013, 2014 and 2015 series were held at the new Menangle Park Paceway at Menangle a village in the Macarthur region of New South Wales, Australia near Sydney.  This was the first time a venue has hosted the event in three consecutive years.

Traditional programming of the series 
Traditionally the series was held over a two-week period with three heats held in the first week, over a sprint distance (1,600 metres - 1,900 m), a middle distance (2,100 m - 2,300 m) and a staying distance (over 2,400 m). The trotters series usually had two heats. The scheduling of the distances is usually at the discretion of the host club. At each round of heats there are three races to accommodate the number of horses in the series. The final and consolation are held usually around a week after the final round of heats. The usual distance is a longer distance in excess of 2,400 metres.

Programming of the 2008 Melbourne Series 
Harness Racing Victoria proposed a new system for the 2008 series that was accepted by the Interdominion Racing Council that rewards Grand Circuit race winners. Each winner of a Grand Circuit race and the Grand Circuit Champion from the time period from the last Inter Dominion all gain an automatic start in two minimum $70,000 semi finals with the balance to be made up from horse that qualify through heats of at least $25,000 held a week previous. The first five horses in each heat along with the sixth horse in the fastest heat qualify for a minimum $750,000 final. The prizemoney had been originally put to $1,000,000, but due to the dire effects of the equine influenza that crippled the industry the final prizemoney was reduced to $750,000. The trotters series consisted of two semi-finals and a final.

The trotting series was reduced to a simple semi and finals series raced over seven days. The semi finals were of $40,000 and the final was $250,000 which was comparable with previous series.

Programming of the 2009-2017 series 
The system used in Melbourne received much criticism and therefore wasn't chosen to be used in the 2009 series on the Gold Coast. The Gold Coast series had two rounds of heats and bonus points for winning major races. The bonus points races are not only include Grand Circuit races in Australia and New Zealand, but also The Graduate at The Meadowlands and the Canadian Pacing Derby, both open age races in North America. The prizemoney was also raised to $1,000,000 for the final. The trotters series remained as a two semi-final series held in Melbourne.

The 2010 series in New South Wales kept a similar format with no bonus points. The trotters series was again held in Melbourne. The 2011 series at Alexandra Park featured two rounds of heats for both pacers and trotters. A change to the points system saw points awarded only to the top eight placegetters - previously all heat runners earned points.

The 2012 series in Perth returned to the traditional three-heat format, while the trotters series was held in Melbourne, and was discontinued after 2012.

A new tender process replaced the rotation format and New South Wales won the tender to host the series from 2013-2015. However, a new structure saw seven heats run at different racetracks across Australia and New Zealand, with the winners and highest-ranked placegetters contesting a 14-horse final at Menangle.

The 2015-17 Championships were awarded to Gloucester Park, Perth, Western Australia. Gloucester Park planned to run the series over the traditional four night format in December for each of the three years.

Programming of the 2018-2026 series 
In late 2017 Harness Racing Australia (HRA) confirmed it had endorsed a proposal from Harness Racing Victoria (HRV), Harness Racing New Zealand (HRNZ), and Club Menangle/Harness Racing NSW (HRNSW) to rotate the series between those organisations, starting  in Victoria in 2018. The 2018 series commences with Heat 1 at Melton on 1 December, Heat 2 at Ballarat on 4 December, Heat 3 at Cranbourne on 8 December, culminating in the Grand Final at Tabcorp Park Melton on 15 December.

Date and time of rotating championships  
The rotation of the Championships is fixed annually at a meeting of the Council. It is fixed five years in advance. Historically, it was held in New Zealand once in each four years, but that pattern has been recently broken. The Championships are held once in each racing year at a time and venue approved by the Council by the completion of the Championships in the preceding year. The Grand Circuit race is not held at the same time as the Championships.

Venues  
1936  -  Gloucester Park
1937  -  Wayville Showgrounds
1938  -  Addington Raceway (NZ)
1939  -  Elphin Paceway
1940  -  Gloucester Park
1947  -  Gloucester Park
1948  -  Alexandra Park (NZ)
1949  -  Wayville Showgrounds
1950  -  Melbourne Showgrounds
1951  -  Addington Raceway (NZ)
1952  -  Harold Park Paceway
1953  -  Gloucester Park
1954  -  Wayville Showgrounds
1955  -  Alexandra Park (NZ)
1956  -  Harold Park Paceway
1957  -  Gloucester Park
1958  -  Wayville Showgrounds
1959  -  Melbourne Showgrounds
1960  -  Harold Park Paceway
1961  -  Addington Raceway (NZ)
1962  -  Gloucester Park
1963  -  Wayville Showgrounds
1964  -  Melbourne Showgrounds
1965  -  Forbury Park Raceway (NZ)
1966  -  Harold Park Paceway
1967  -  Gloucester Park
1968  -  Alexandra Park (NZ)
1969  -  Wayville Showgrounds
1970  -  Melbourne Showgrounds
1971  -  Addington Raceway (NZ)
1972  -  Albion Park Paceway
1973  -  Harold Park Paceway
1974  -  Gloucester Park
1975  -  Alexandra Park (NZ)
1976  -  Globe Derby Park
1977  -  Albion Park Paceway
1978  -  Moonee Valley Racecourse
1979  -  Addington Raceway (NZ)
1980  -  Harold Park Paceway
1981  -  Royal Hobart Showground
1982  -  Gloucester Park
1983  -  Alexandra Park (NZ)
1984  -  Globe Derby Park
1985  -  Moonee Valley Racecourse
1986  -  Albion Park Paceway
1987  -  Addington Raceway (NZ)
1988  -  Harold Park Paceway
1989  -  Gloucester Park
1990  -  Globe Derby Park
1991  -  Alexandra Park (NZ)
1992  -  Moonee Valley Racecourse
1993  -  Albion Park Paceway
1994  -  Harold Park Paceway
1995  -  Addington Raceway (NZ)
1996  -  Gloucester Park
1997  -  Globe Derby Park
1998  -  Tattersalls Park
1999  -  Alexandra Park (NZ)
2000  -  Moonee Valley Racecourse
2001  -  Albion Park Paceway
2002  -  Harold Park Paceway
2003  -  Addington Raceway (NZ)
2004  -  Gloucester Park
2005  -  Alexandra Park (NZ)
2006  -  Tattersalls Park
2007  -  Globe Derby Park
2008  -  Moonee Valley Racecourse
2009  -  Gold Coast Parklands
2010  -  Menangle Park Paceway
2011  -  Alexandra Park (NZ)
2012  -  Gloucester Park
2013  -  Menangle Park Paceway
2014  -  Menangle Park Paceway
2015  -  Menangle Park Paceway
2015  -  Gloucester Park
2016  -  Gloucester Park
2017  -  Gloucester Park
2018  -  Tabcorp Park Melton
2019  -  Alexandra Park (NZ)
2020  -  not held
2021  -  Menangle Park Paceway
2022  -   Victoria (heats at Ballarat, Shepparton & Geelong, the finals held at Melton)

Eligibility 
A horse shall not start in a race outside the Championships except in a race held after the completion of all qualifying races. The Controlling Body of the State or New Zealand in which the Championships are to be conducted or the Council may request a veterinary surgeon to inspect and provide a report on any horse scratched after final acceptances are declared.

Trophy 
A perpetual trophy is competed for.  The conducting Club of the State or New Zealand in which the winning owner resides holds the trophy for a period until three months before the start of the next Inter Dominion Championship. The winner of the Inter Dominion Championship Final is presented with a trophy.

Previous winners

Pacers 
for a complete list of winners please see: Inter Dominion Pacing Championship

Trotters 
for a complete list of winners please see: Inter Dominion Trotting Championship

1952 Inter-Dominion racebook

References

External links 
 2009 Watpac Inter Dominion Official Site
 Rotation Program - Inter Dominion Championship Series
 Queensland Harness Racing Homepage - Host state for 2009 Inter Dominion

See also 
 Inter Dominion Pacing Championship
 Inter Dominion Trotting Championship
 Inter Dominion Hall of Fame
 Harness racing
 Harness racing in Australia
 Harness racing in New Zealand

 
Recurring sporting events established in 1936
Harness races in Australia
Australasian Grand Circuit Races
Harness racing in New Zealand
Inter Dominion winners